Bait-and-switch is a form of fraud used in retail sales but also employed in other contexts. First, customers are "baited" by merchants' advertising products or services at a low price, but when customers visit the store, they discover that the advertised goods are not available, or the customers are pressured by salespeople to consider similar, but higher-priced items ("switching").

Bait-and-switch techniques have a long and widespread history as a part of commercial culture. Many variations on the bait-and-switch appear, for example, in China's earliest book of stories about fraud, Zhang Yingyu's The Book of Swindles (c. 1617).

Function
The intention of the bait-and-switch is to encourage purchases of substituted goods, making consumers satisfied with the available stock offered, as an alternative to a disappointment or inconvenience of acquiring no goods (or bait) at all, and reckoning on a seemingly partial recovery of sunk costs expended trying to obtain the bait. It suggests that the seller will not show the original product or service advertised but instead will demonstrate a more expensive product or a similarly priced but lower quality product. In either case, the seller expects to earn a higher margin on the substitute product.

Legality
In the United States, courts have held that the purveyor using a bait-and-switch operation may be subject to a lawsuit by customers for false advertising, and can be sued for trademark infringement by competing manufacturers, retailers, and others who profit from the sale of the product used as bait. However, no cause of action will exist if the purveyor is capable of actually selling the goods advertised, but aggressively pushes a competing product.

Likewise, advertising a sale while intending to stock a limited amount of, and thereby sell out, a loss-leading item advertised is legal in the United States. The purveyor can escape liability if they make clear in their advertisements that quantities of items for which a sale is offered are limited, or by offering a rain check on sold-out items.

In England and Wales, bait and switch is banned under the Consumer Protection from Unfair Trading Regulations 2008; breaking this law can result in a criminal prosecution, an unlimited fine and two years in jail.
In Canada, this tactic is illegal under the Competition Act. In Australia, bait advertising is illegal under the Competition and Consumer Act 2010 (formerly known as the Trade Practices Act 1974).

Non-retail use
 A bait-and-switch interview is when a potential employee hires another person to be their stand-in during the job interview process.
 Online sellers use bait-and-switch by showing a photograph of a desired item to get sales, then shipping a cheaper copy of the item or a picture of the item.
 Car dealerships and auto brokers have also been known to use various forms of bait-and-switch or similar tactics, such as advertising vehicles online at what seems like a bargain price, only for the customer to discover that the specific vehicle is no longer available, as well as adding on a plethora of additional fees or even changing the sale price when coming close to closing the sale.

Politics
In lawmaking, "caption bills" that propose minor changes in law with simplistic titles (the bait) are introduced to the legislature with the ultimate objective of substantially changing the wording (the switch) at a later date in order to try to smooth the passage of a controversial or major amendment. Rule changes are also proposed (the bait) to meet legal requirements for public notice and mandated public hearings, then different rules are proposed at a final meeting (the switch), thus bypassing the objective of public notice and public discussion on the actual rules voted upon.

See also

References

External links

Advertising techniques
Selling techniques
Persuasion techniques
Commercial crimes
Fraud
Ethically disputed business practices
Diversionary tactics